Mendy López Aude (born October 15, 1973) is a Dominican professional baseball player and coach for the Pittsburgh Pirates. As an infielder, López played in Major League Baseball for the Kansas City Royals, Florida Marlins, Houston Astros, and Pittsburgh Pirates from 1998 to 2004 and for the Samsung Lions of the KBO League in 2004.

Career
López was signed as an amateur free agent by the Kansas City Royals on February 26, . He is often referred to as a "journeyman", a title bestowed upon those in the sports world who play on several different teams within a short amount of time. Lopez has played for four Major League Baseball teams over the span of his 7-year career: the Kansas City Royals (-, -), the Florida Marlins, the Houston Astros, and the Pittsburgh Pirates (2001-).

On July 9, 2004, the Kansas City Royals sold his contract to the Samsung Lions of the Korea Baseball Organization. He was selected as the most valuable player of the best-of-five playoff series where the Lions defeated the Doosan Bears to advance to the 2004 Korean Series.

In , López played for the Sultanes Monterrey of the Mexican League. He hit .304 with 21 home runs and 67 RBI. In , he again played for Monterrey batting .321 with 22 home runs and 97 RBI. He played for Águilas Cibaeñas in the Dominican Winter League in 2008. Lopez played for the Sultanes de Monterrey of the Mexican League in 2010.

References

External links

1973 births
Living people
Águilas Cibaeñas players
Arizona League Royals players
Calgary Cannons players
Dominican Republic expatriate baseball players in Canada
Dominican Republic expatriate baseball players in Mexico
Dominican Republic expatriate baseball players in South Korea
Dominican Republic expatriate baseball players in the United States
Florida Marlins players
Gulf Coast Royals players
Houston Astros players
Kansas City Royals players
KBO League infielders
Major League Baseball infielders
Major League Baseball players from the Dominican Republic
Mexican League baseball first basemen
Mexican League baseball third basemen
Mexican League Most Valuable Player Award winners
Nashville Sounds players
New Orleans Zephyrs players
Omaha Golden Spikes players
Omaha Royals players
Pericos de Puebla players
Pittsburgh Pirates players
Rieleros de Aguascalientes players
Samsung Lions players
Sultanes de Monterrey players
Wilmington Blue Rocks players
Wichita Wranglers players